The Prince Turki bin Abdul Aziz Stadium is a stadium in Riyadh, Saudi Arabia.

It is the home of Al-Riyadh SC.

References

1983 establishments in Saudi Arabia
Football venues in Saudi Arabia
Buildings and structures in Riyadh
Sports venues in Saudi Arabia
Multi-purpose stadiums in Saudi Arabia
Sport in Riyadh